Police Academy Stadium is a football stadium in Abbassia, Cairo, Egypt. It is the home stadium for Ittihad El Shorta and for El Dakhleya since the 2017–18 season.

Stadiums in Cairo
Football in Cairo